Communist Party of Georgia is a communist party in Georgia. The party was founded on 23 February 1992 as the Socialist Labour Party. It was registered at the Ministry of Justice on 27 February 1998. In the 1992 elections it won four MPs. During the period 1994–1995 it maintained a parliamentary fraction. In the 1995 elections it polled 3% of the votes.

Ivan Tsiklauri is the First Secretary of the party. The main goal of the party is restoration of the socialist system. It publishes Komunisti-XXI. In 1999 it claimed to have 15,000 members. The party has a youth organization, Komsomol.

In 1991 and 1995 SKP supported the candidacies of Eduard Shevardnadze.

In the 1999 elections it ran in an electoral bloc called Bloc "Communists - Stalinists" together with the political party "Stalineli".

For the 2000 presidential elections SKP nominated Ivan Tsiklauri, but the nomination was later withdrawn.

The Communist Party of Adzharia is an autonomous organization within SKP.

See also 
:Category:Communist Party of Georgia (Soviet Union)

1992 establishments in Georgia (country)
Anti-revisionist organizations
Stalinist parties
Communist parties in Georgia (country)
Political parties established in 1992
Political parties in Georgia (country)